Shanxi University of Traditional Chinese Medicine (SXTCM), also known as the Shanxi College. In November 2019 SXTCM, along with 20 other Traditional Medicine Universities, lost its recognition as a Medical University by World Health Organization (WHO). As of 2020 Graduates from Shanxi University of Traditional Chinese Medicine can only work in fields related to Chinese Medicine.

Teaching institutions
 Basic Medical School of Clinical Chinese Medicine 
 Acupuncture and Massage College of Traditional Chinese Medicine
 College of Nursing College of Integrative Medicine
 Clinical College of Chinese Medicine School of Management
 Fu Shan Institute of Humanities Institute of Pharmacy and Food Engineering
 School of Continuing Education (Vocational and Technical College)
 Graduate School Center for Education of Ideological and Political Theory
 Teaching and Research Department of Sports
 Management Center Experiment

History
The predecessor of Shanxi College of Shanxi Medical College in 1978, founded by University of Traditional Chinese Medicine classes, in 1989 by the former State Board of Education approved the formal establishment of Shanxi Medical College, in 2001 began to recruit graduate students. It is a key university in Shanxi Province, the first batch of the Ministry of Education Excellence Doctors (TCM) education and training program reform and universities.

After 30 years of construction and development, the school was built as a discipline so Chinese medicine-based, with distinct characteristics of Chinese medicine, the medical research in close connection with the higher institutions of Chinese medicine, Chinese medicine Shanxi Province personnel training, technological innovation, medical and social services and cultural heritage center.

Affiliated hospitals 
Shanxi College of Traditional Chinese

References 

Universities and colleges in Shanxi